Drillia barkliensis is a species of sea snail, a marine gastropod mollusk in the family Drilliidae.

Description
The whorls are granulated minutely, with a tuberculated shoulder. The shell is chocolate- or orange-brown, the latter often white-banded above the shoulder, and sometimes with an inferior narrow darker band. The tubercles and usually the granules are white.

Distribution
This species occurs in the Indian Ocean off Mauritius and in the Pacific Ocean off New Caledonia.

References

  Adams, H. (1869) Descriptions of a new genus and fourteen new species of marine shells. Proceedings of the Zoological Society of London, 1869, 272–275, pl. 19
 Michel, C. (1988). Marine molluscs of Mauritius. Editions de l'Ocean Indien. Stanley, Rose Hill. Mauritius 
 Tucker J.K. (2004) Catalogue of Recent and fossil turrids (Mollusca: Gastropoda). Zootaxa 682: 1–1295

External links
 

barkliensis
Gastropods described in 1869